Lower Mitcham is an inner southern suburb of Adelaide, South Australia in the local government area of Mitcham. To the north, it is bounded by Grange Road, to the east by Belair Road, to the south by Murray Street. To the west, the suburb is bordered by a line running from Murray Street along View Street and continuing north to Grange Road.

There is only one institution in the suburb, the former Mitcham Primary School, which is now a Community Centre. There are no surviving shops in commercial use, there is a Guild Hall on Wattle Street, and there is the Mitcham Railway Station. There is a small sports (tennis) centre on Denman Terrace. All other buildings in the suburb are private residences. Many of the homes were built in the 1920s in the California Bungalow style.

References

Suburbs of Adelaide